Ngeri Setima Benebo, MFR (was born in May 11, 1955) is a Nigerian medical doctor and public health specialist. She was, until 2015, Director General and Chief Executive Officer of the National Environmental Standards and Regulations Enforcement Agency (NESREA). Her appointment was approved by the Federal Government of Nigeria in December 2006 under the administration of Chief Olusegun  Obasanjo.

Early life and education
Born in Okrika, a port town of Rivers State, Nigeria, Benebo received her West African Senior School Certificate in 1971 after attending Methodist Girls High School Yaba. She proceeded to Federal School of Arts and Science for her "A" Levels obtaining the General Certificate of Education (GCE) in 1974. Between 1979 and 1986, she earned a Medical Doctor (MD) degree from University of Liberia's A. M. Dogliotti College of Medicine and a master's degree in public health from University of Lagos's College of Medicine. In 1991, she was awarded a certificate in Training and Organization Skills for senior managers at the University of London.

Benebo is an alumnus of the National Postgraduate Medicine College of Public Health. She holds a certificate in Management from the Administrative Staff College of Nigeria (ASCON) Badagry.

National Environmental Standards and Regulations Enforcement Agency
In 2006, she was appointed Director General and Chief Executive Officer of the National Environmental Standards and Regulations Enforcement Agency (NESREA). Prior to that, she served as Director of Pollution Control and Environmental Health at the Federal Ministry of Environment.

Achievements in office
 Initiation and actualization of West African Network on Environmental Compliance and Enforcement (WANECE).
 Establishment of the NESREA Green Corps.
 Revival of the National Toxic Waste Dump Watch Committee (NTWDWC).
 Introduction of 24 or 28 environmental regulations into the Gazette of the Government of Nigeria.

Awards
Benebo has won the following awards:

 National Productivity Merit Award (1991)
 Quality Management Standard Person of the Year (2010)
 Environmental Man of the Year
 Nigeria Advancement Awards (2013)

See also
 List of people from Rivers State

References

External links
 Benebo's Profile from NESREA

1955 births
Living people
Medical doctors from Rivers State
University of Liberia alumni
Alumni of the University of London
University of Lagos alumni
Members of the Order of the Federal Republic
Nigerian public health doctors
People from Okrika
Heads of government agencies of Nigeria
Nigerian Christians